A by-election was held for the New South Wales Legislative Assembly electorate of Newcastle on 27 May 1872. The by-election was triggered because George Lloyd had been appointed Postmaster-General in the first Parkes ministry.

Henry Parkes comfortably retained his seat at the East Sydney by-election held the week before, while the five other ministers were re-elected unopposed.

Dates

Results

George Lloyd was appointed Postmaster-General in the first Parkes ministry.

See also
Electoral results for the district of Newcastle
List of New South Wales state by-elections

References

New South Wales state by-elections
1891 elections in Australia
1880s in New South Wales